Ashmit Shrestha (born 3 March 1996) is a Nepalese cricketer who plays for the Nigeria national cricket team. He is a right-handed batsman and wicket-keeper.

Shrestha grew up in Bhairahawa, Nepal. He moved to Nigeria in 2015 to work for a steel company, where he joined the Rising Stars Cricket Club in Lagos.

Shrestha made his Twenty20 International debut for Nigeria against Sierra Leone in October 2021. He then played for Nigeria in the 2021 ICC Men's T20 World Cup Africa Qualifier Regional Final.

References

External links
 

1996 births
Living people
Nepalese cricketers
Nigerian cricketers
Nigeria Twenty20 International cricketers
Place of birth missing (living people)
Nepalese expatriates in Nigeria
People from Rupandehi District